MV Tulpar is a Kazakh ice-breaking and supply ship that was built in 2002 by Norwegian shipbuilder Ulstein Verft. It is based at Aktau and was originally registered to the Cayman Islands but soon moved to Kazakhstan.

External links
 Danish shipping registry
 Ulstein catalogue

2002 ships
Icebreakers
Ships built in Ulstein